The Southwest Missouri Prehistoric Rock Shelter and Cave Sites Discontiguous Archeological District is a historic district spread out over discontiguous sites in four Missouri counties.  It includes 20 contributing sites.  It was listed on the National Register of Historic Places in 1991.

References

Archaeological sites in Missouri
National Register of Historic Places in Barry County, Missouri
National Register of Historic Places in Christian County, Missouri
National Register of Historic Places in Douglas County, Missouri
National Register of Historic Places in Stone County, Missouri